Harpswell is a town in Cumberland County, Maine, United States, within Casco Bay in the Gulf of Maine. The population was 5,031 at the 2020 census. Harpswell is composed of land contiguous with the rest of Cumberland County, called Harpswell Neck, as well as three large islands connected by bridges: Sebascodegan Island (locally known as Great Island), Orr's Island, and Bailey Island and over 200 smaller islands. Harpswell is part of the Portland–South Portland–Biddeford, Maine Metropolitan Statistical Area.

History
The Native Americans who originally inhabited Harpswell were part of the Abenaki. The Abenaki name for Harpswell Neck, then called West Harpswell, was Merriconeag or "quick carrying place", a reference to the narrow peninsula's easy portage. The Abenaki name for Great Island was Erascohegan or Sebascodiggin, which became by the late 1800s Sebascodegan Island. About 1659 Major Nicholas Shapleigh of Kittery, Maine, bought Merriconeag and Sebascodegan Island from the Abenaki, but because of Indian defense, attempts to settle the area were abandoned until after Dummer's War. The Treaty of 1725 brought a truce, and by 1731 many settlers had returned.

Formerly a part of North Yarmouth, in 1758 the town was incorporated by the Massachusetts General Court and named for Harpswell in Lincolnshire, England. Industries included farming and some shipbuilding, but fishing brought considerable profit, and lobstering is still a thriving part of the economy. Because of its scenic beauty, Harpswell is today a favorite with artists and tourists. The Bailey Island Bridge is an National Historic Civil Engineering Landmark.

Geography
The town is situated on Casco Bay in the Gulf of Maine, part of the Atlantic Ocean.

The town is crossed by state routes 24 and 123. It is bordered by the town of Brunswick to the north, and is separated by the New Meadows River from West Bath to the northeast and Phippsburg to the east.

Demographics

2010 census
As of the census of 2010, there were 4,740 people, 2,218 households, and 1,450 families living in the town. The racial makeup of the town was 97.7% White, 0.1% African American, 0.3% Native American, 0.6% Asian, 0.1% from other races, and 1.3% from two or more races. Hispanic or Latino of any race were 0.8% of the population.

There were 2,218 households, of which 19.1% had children under the age of 18 living with them, 55.3% were married couples living together, 6.4% had a female householder with no husband present, 3.7% had a male householder with no wife present, and 34.6% were non-families. 27.1% of all households were made up of individuals, and 12.8% had someone living alone who was 65 years of age or older. The average household size was 2.13 and the average family size was 2.53.

The median age in the town was 52.9 years. 15% of residents were under the age of 18; 4.7% were between the ages of 18 and 24; 16.9% were from 25 to 44; 37.5% were from 45 to 64; and 25.9% were 65 years of age or older. The gender makeup of the town was 48.4% male and 51.6% female.

2000 census
As of the census of 2000, there were 5,239 people, 2,340 households, and 1,532 families living in the town. The racial makeup of the town was 97.94% White, 0.25% African American, 0.34% Native American, 0.55% Asian, 0.23% from other races, and 0.69% from two or more races. Hispanic or Latino of any race were 1.32% of the population.

There were 2,340 households, out of which 24.0% had children under the age of 18 living with them, 56.1% were married couples living together, 6.3% had a female householder with no husband present, and 34.5% were non-families. 27.3% of all households were made up of individuals, and 10.9% had someone living alone who was 65 years of age or older.  The average household size was 2.24 and the average family size was 2.69.

In the town, the population was spread out, with 19.6% under the age of 18, 4.9% from 18 to 24, 25.1% from 25 to 44, 31.7% from 45 to 64, and 18.8% who were 65 years of age or older.  The median age was 45 years. For every 100 females, there were 96.1 males.  For every 100 females age 18 and over, there were 93.3 males.

The median income for a household in the town was $40,611, and the median income for a family was $45,119. Males had a median income of $34,167 versus $30,000 for females. The per capita income for the town was $30,433.  About 3.3% of families and 5.6% of the population were below the poverty line, including 6.8% of those under age 18 and 3.8% of those age 65 or over.

Fire, EMS, police 
Fire protection services are provided in Harpswell by three unique and nonrelated volunteer fire departments. All three departments provide EMS services and operate ambulances. A town contracted paramedic is stationed 24/7 at the town hall.
 Harpswell Neck Fire Department
 Orr's and Bailey Island Fire Department
 Cundy's Harbor Fire Department

Law enforcement services are provided by the Cumberland County Sheriff's Office.

Notable people 

 John Chryssavgis, author, theologian
 Patrick Dempsey, actor
 Stephen M. Etnier, artist
 Richard Jacques (military officer)
 Elijah Kellogg, minister, lecturer, author
 Samuel Merritt, physician, businessman, mayor, regent
 Edna St. Vincent Millay, poet
 James L. Nelson, novelist
 Robert Peary, explorer
 Alexander Petrunkevitch, Yale professor and arachnologist

Education

Public schools in the area are operated by Maine School Administrative District 75. During the 2010–2011 school year, Harpswell residents voted to close the West Harpswell School, one of the town's two K–5 elementary schools. Beginning in 2011–2012, West Harpswell students began being bused to the Harpswell Islands School. It was due to save approximately $200,000 a year. In September 2013, Harpswell Coastal Academy, a charter school serving grades 6–12 opened in the old West Harpswell School.

In popular culture

The fictional murder mystery Blow the Man Down was filmed in Harpswell in 2018. The name of the town in the film is changed to Easter Cove, Maine.

The Marvel Comics superhero Carol Danvers has a family home in Harpswell.

Sites of interest

 Eagle Island State Historic Site, summer home of Admiral Robert Peary
 Harpswell Historical Society Museum
 Ragged Island – Summer home of Edna St. Vincent Millay

References

Further reading
  History of Brunswick, Topsham, and Harpswell, Maine Including Ancient Pejepscot.  By George Augustus Wheeler and Henry Warren Wheeler. Published 1878. Full image at books.google.
 Pejepscot Historical Society (official website)

External links

 Town of Harpswell official website
 Harpswell Maine Business Association
 Orr's Island Library
 Cundy's Harbor Library
 Curtis Library, Brunswick (regional library)
 Harpswell Historical Society
 Maine.gov – Harpswell, Maine
 Maine Genealogy: Harpswell, Cumberland County, Maine

 
Casco Bay
Towns in Cumberland County, Maine
Populated coastal places in Maine
Portland metropolitan area, Maine
Towns in Maine